North Haven is a suburb in the Camden Haven district on the Mid North Coast of New South Wales, Australia. As the suburb's name suggests, North Haven is located on the northern shore of Camden Haven and is connected to the nearby commercial centre of Laurieton by a bridge.

North Haven is mainly residential, though there is a small row of shops along the main street, Ocean Drive. Like much of the Mid North Coast, the suburb is notable for its large proportion of retirees; the median age at the 2006 Census was 57.

History
In the early 1930s, North Haven only had two permanent residents: the Ostler and Eames families. During some period, a rutile sandmining plant was erected at the mouth of the Camden Haven River, by the breakwall.

References

Localities in New South Wales
Mid North Coast